The 2006–07 División de Honor Juvenil de Fútbol season was the 21st since its establishment.

Group 1

Group 2

Group 3

Group 4

Group 5

Group 6

Group 7

Copa de Campeones

Group A

Group B

1st round

2nd round

Final

Details

See also
2007 Copa del Rey Juvenil

External links
 Royal Spanish Football Federation website

División de Honor Juvenil de Fútbol seasons
Juvenil